Krisis is a peer-reviewed open-access academic journal covering mainly continental contemporary philosophy, publishing articles in both Dutch and English. The focus of Krisis is in the field of social, cultural, and political thought, featuring articles that show the relevance of classical thinkers for contemporary problems. In recent decades, Krisis increasingly published original contributions in the political and social philosophy, cultural theory, philosophy of science and technology, and (partly born in the Netherlands) empirical philosophy.

External links 
 

Creative Commons-licensed journals
Multilingual journals
Philosophy journals
Publications established in 1980
Quarterly journals